The first website was created in August 1991 by Tim Berners-Lee at CERN, a European nuclear research agency. Berners-Lee's WorldWideWeb browser was made publicly available that month. The World Wide Web began to enter everyday use in 1993–4, when websites for the general public started to become available. By the end of 1994, the total number of websites was still minute compared to present figures, but quite a number of notable websites were already active, many of which are the precursors or inspiring examples of today's most popular services. Of the thousands of websites founded prior to 1995, those appearing here are listed for one or more of the following reasons:

 They still exist (albeit in some cases with different names).
 They made contributions to the history of the World Wide Web.
 They helped to shape certain modern Web content, such as webcomics and weblogs.

1991
CERN
 Snapshot of the CERN site The World Wide Web project, the first website, as of November 1992. The Web was publicly announced (via a posting to the Usenet newsgroup alt.hypertext) on August 6, 1991.
World Wide Web Virtual Library Originally Tim Berners-Lee's web catalog at CERN. Snapshot from November 1992: Subject listing – Information by Subject. http://info.cern.ch/hypertext/WWW/TheProject.html
Stanford Linear Accelerator Center Paul Kunz from SLAC visited Tim Berners-Lee at CERN in September 1991. He was impressed by the WWW project and brought a copy of the software back to Stanford. SLAC launched the first web server in North America on December 12, 1991. SLAC first web page: SLACVM Information Service.

1992
Near the end of 1992, there were approximately 50-60 websites, according to a robot web crawl by CWI researcher Guido van Rossum
Nikhef The Dutch National institute for subatomic physics, originally at http://nic.nikhef.nl. This site was the third website in the world to come online in February 1992, after CERN and SLAC.
National Center for Supercomputing Applications The National Center for Supercomputing Applications site was an early home to the NCSA Mosaic web browser, as well as documentation on the web and a "What's New?" list which many people used as an early web directory.
Fermilab Second web server in North America, following in the trend of high-energy physics laboratories.
SunSITE Early, comprehensive archiving project. Project as a whole started in 1992 and was quick to move to the web.
Ohio State University Department of Computer and Information Science Early development of gateway programs, and mass conversion of existing documents, including RFCs, TeXinfo, UNIX man pages, and the Usenet FAQs.
IN2P3 The French National institute for nuclear physics and particle physics, originally at Centre de Calcul IN2P3.
HUJI The Hebrew University of Jerusalem Information service – both in Hebrew and English. It was the first RTL website and the 10th to come online in April 1992, at http://www.huji.ac.il.

The Exploratorium One of the first science museums on-line.
youngmonkey (studios)
Initially hosted as a .nb.ca domain, showcasing music/writing projects and software products (DOS/Amiga). Also includes articles, technical information, and other resources for synthesizer enthusiasts, developers, and others. Home to likely the first online store (SalesSite) using dial-up credit card verification; and first web streaming, video distribution, and pay-per-view online video system (StreamSite). Came online at some point, still to be determined, in 1991–1992. Moved to its .ca domain (https://www.youngmonkey.ca) in April 1995.
simianpress (a manifestation of youngmonkey)
A showcase for graphic design and publishing projects, and likely offering the first professional website design. The slater mergedline at some point, still to be determined, in between 1991–1992. It was later merged with youngmonkey's .ca domain in 1995.
CBSS (Consulting Firm)
Came online in late 1992, CBSS Inc. of Houston, Texas quietly offered what was very likely the first commercial Website hosting service. CBSS pioneered Web access via mobile phone through Motorola's proprietary cellular data interface. The Motorola service is no longer maintained, but the Website is still visible today at CBSS, Inc..
KEK The High Energy Accelerator Research Organization.  The first web page in Japan was created by Dr. Yohei Morita at the suggestion of Dr. Tim Berners-Lee in September 1992.  CERN's web site linked the KEK page on 30 September 1992. Still online at KEK Entry Point.

Cybergrass Bluegrass Music News and Information.  Bob Cherry's music web site was launched on September 9, 1992.  It became called "Banjo" on September 30, 1992, and later "Cybergrass in 1995". Its content was bluegrass music and Digital Traditions lyrics & chords and was hosted on the Xerox Palo Alto Research Center's vax, parcvax.xerox.com.  It now resides at www.cybergrass.com.  It was the first music-based website on the web.

1993

By the end of 1993, there were 623 websites, according to a study by Massachusetts Institute of Technology's (MIT) researcher Matthew Gray.
ALIWEB (Archie Like Indexing for the WEB) is considered the first Web search engine. It was announced in November 1993  by its developer Martijn Koster. ALIWEB was presented in May 1994 at the First International Conference at CERN in Geneva. 
Bloomberg.com Financial portal with information on markets, currency conversion, news and events, and Bloomberg Terminal subscriptions.
BridesByDeBora.com Wedding and Bridal store founded in 1990 on internet in 1993 as BridesbyDeBora.com which later changed to DeBoraRachelle.com aka DeBora Rachelle and PromDressShop.com 
Chabad.org The flagship website of the Chabad-Lubavitch Hasidic movement. It serves its own members and Jews worldwide.
Corpus of Electronic Texts (formerly CURIA) Peter Flynn from University College Cork (UCC) saw Tim Berners-Lee demonstrating the WWW at a RARE WG3 meeting. The former then requested the latter to install the software at UCC for the CURIA project.
Doctor Fun One of the first webcomics, noted by the NCSA as "a major breakthrough for the Web".
The LANL preprint archive Web access to thousands of papers in physics, mathematics, computer science, and biology; developed out of earlier gopher, File Transfer Protocol (ftp), and e-mail archives at Los Alamos. Now known as ArXiv.
Électricité de France One of the first industrial Web sites in Europe which started as the Web site of the Research and Development (R&D) Division, and was implemented by R&D Engineers Sylvain Langlois, Emmanuel Poiret and a few months later Daniel Glazman. They did not have approval for that and had to restart the server, connected to RENATER through a 155Mb link, every time IT was shutting it down for lack of approval. Electricité de France's R&D later submitted patches to CERN httpd and was active in Web Standardisation.
Global Network Navigator Example of an early web directory created by O'Reilly Media and one of the Web's first commercial sites; it was hosted at Bolt Beranek and Newman (BBN).
Haystack Observatory Haystack Observatory's website explained its radio and radar remote sensing mission and provided data access for science users. The content was rolled out on December 13, 1993, by Dr. John Holt of Haystack. The website is still active, and the original web page format is still available online.
The Internet Movie DatabaseFounded in 1990 by participants in the Usenet newsgroup rec.arts.movies, the IMDB was rolled out on the web in late 1993, hosted by the computer science department of Cardiff University in Wales.
Internet Underground Music Archive Created by students at the University of California, Santa Cruz to help promote unsigned musical artists. Music was shared using the MP2 format, presaging the later extreme popularity of MP3 sharing and Online music stores.

Joachim Jarre Society 
Created by students at the [Norwegian_University_of_Science_and_Technology] and one of the first websites in Norway from November 1993 and still online

JumpStation
The world's first Web search engine, created by Jonathon Fletcher on December 12, 1993, and was hosted at the University of Stirling in Scotland. In operation until 1994.
Kent Anthropology
One of the first social science sites (online May 1993). Originally at http://lucy.kent.ac.uk/. Still online.
SITOAfter a start as an anonymous ftp-based art gallery and collaborative collective, the OTIS project (later SITO) moved to the web due to SunSITE's hosting.
The TechThe MIT campus newspaper, The Tech, claims to be the first newspaper to deliver content over the Web, beginning in May 1993.
NexorWeb site set up for Nexor, by Martijn Koster, an early Internet software company.
MTVThe music television network's domain was registered in 1993 by VJ Adam Curry, who personally ran a small unofficial site.
PARC Map ServerArguably the earliest precursor of MapQuest and Google Maps. PARC researcher Steve Putz tied an existing map viewing program to the web. But now defunct.
photo.net An online photography resource and community, designed and founded by Philip Greenspun.  Greenspun released the software behind photo.net as a free open-source toolkit for building community websites, the ArsDigita Community System.
Principia Cybernetica Probably the first complex, collaborative knowledge system, sporting a hierarchical structure, index, map, annotations, search, plenty of hyperlinks, etc. Designed by Francis Heylighen, Cliff Joslyn and Valentin Turchin to develop a cybernetic philosophy.
ExPASyThe first life sciences web site. Still active.
Trojan room coffee potThe first webcam.
Trincoll Journala multimedia magazine published by students at Trinity College in Hartford Connecticut.
Wired.comAn online presence for Wired magazine.
Nippon Telegraph and Telephone (a.k.a. NTT) NTT's  was the most famous web page in Japan in the mid-1990s. The page was announced in December 1993.

1994
By mid-1994 there were 2,738 websites, according to Gray's statistics; by the end of the year, more than 10,000.
Allied Artists InternationalThe first corporate web site for Allied Artists Entertainment Group, predecessor to Allied Artists International, present day owner of Allied Artists Film Group & Allied Artists Music Group
American Marketing Association Professional Association. Created in 1994 by a group of Marketing professors. It offered general marketing news for marketers and professors of marketing. Approximately a year later, the site was moved to ama.org where it still remains.
Amnesty International Human Rights site. Created in 1994 by the organization's International Secretariat and the Computer Communications Working Group of Amnesty International Canada.
Art.Net"Art on the Net", created by Lile Elam in June 1994 to showcase the artwork of San Francisco Bay Area artists as well as other international artists. It offered free linkage and hosts extensive links to other artists' sites.
Art Crimes The first graffiti art site began to archive photos from around the world, creating an important academic resource as well as a thriving online community.
The Amazing FishCam  A webcam pointed at a fishtank located at Netscape headquarters. According to a contemporaneous article by The Economist, "In its audacious uselessness—and that of thousands of ego trips like it—lie the seeds of the Internet revolution."
Automatic Complaint-Letter Generator Created by Scott Pakin in April 1994, the site allows users to specify the name of the individual or company that the complaint is directed toward, as well as the number of paragraphs the complaint will have. After submitting the data, the computer generates sentences that are composed of arbitrary verbs, nouns, and adjectives. Still active.
BBC Online Started in April with some regional information and Open University Production Centre (OUPC) content. By September, the first commercial service was launched, a transcription service via ftp server. At its peak, it had 122 accounts, including FBI bureaus around the world, taking daily updates from 12 feeds. Still active.
Bianca's Smut Shack An early web-based chatroom and online community known for raucous free speech and deviant behavior.
Birmingham City Council Early local government site, initially hosted by the University of Birmingham.
Buzzweb.com The earliest website for alternative music artists and news. Created by A. Joi Brown and Matthew Brown in 1993–1994. Registered with Network Solutions 1993.
CDNAir.ca The first website for an airline, Canadian Airlines.
Chabad.org The first Ask the rabbi site. Launched by Rabbi Yosef Yitzchak Kazen as an outgrowth of earlier discussion groups on FidoNet dating back to 1988.
CitySites The first "City Site" web development company, advertising businesses and reviewing music and art events in the Bay Area. Started in 1994. CitySites was featured in Interactive Week Magazine in 1997 as numerous other City websites began competing for the business ad market including CitySearch and others. Founder, Darrow Boggiano, still operates CitySites.
Cool Site of the Day Glenn Davis' daily pick of 'cool' websites.
Cybersell The first commercial advertising service that focused on using spam comes online as sell.com, it was set up by Laurence Canter and Martha Siegel, notorious for spamming Usenet newsgroups earlier that year.
CORDIS The Community Research & Development Information Service, the European Commission's first permanent website, providing the repository of EU-funded research projects. Launched on ESPRIT day in November 1994 as www.cordis.lu.
The Economist The Economist "went live in early 1994" with a website "structured as a portal with various search tools of the day (e.g., Archie, Veronica, Jughead, WAIS and Gopher)"; it cost $120, paid for by one of the magazine's correspondents, and by the end of the year "America Online voted it one of the world's top-ten news sites, nosing out Time-Warner's celebrated Pathfinder site—which reputedly cost $120 million to build."
Einet Galaxy Claims to be the first searchable web catalog; originally created at the Einet division of the MCC Research Consortium at the University of Texas, Austin. It passed through several commercial owners and is now run by Logika Corporation.
Encyclopaedia Britannica Online
Enterzone First purely web-based (no gopher!) literary webzine (originally published at enterzone.berkeley.edu). 
EPage Classifieds First Web classified ad site (was originally at ep.com). 
First Virtual First "cyber-bank". 
FolkBook / An Online Acoustic Music Establishment A fansite dedicated to documenting Folk Music and Folk Musicians.  It operated at Ohio State at web.cgrg.ohio-state.edu/folkbook/ , from September 1, 1994, until it was taken off-line on March 7, 1998.  After that it was redirected to a similar Folk Music site, folkmusic dot org , which still exists, but which has not been updated since 2002.
FogCam! World's oldest still operating webcam. Located at San Francisco State University.
Flags of the World
GeneNetworkFirst web site in biomedical research (service initiated in January 1994) and the earliest Uniform Resource Locator (URL) in PubMed. GeneNetwork was initially known as the Portable Dictionary of the Mouse Genome and then as WebQTL. This genetics site has been funded continuously by National Institutes of Health (NIH) and the University of Tennessee-Oak Ridge National Laboratory Governor's Chair to RW Williams.
HM TreasuryWebsite of HM Treasury, the United Kingdom government department.
Home Page Replica
A fansite dedicated to researching the history and music of Captain Beefheart & His Magic Band.
HotWiredWebsite of Wired magazine with its own unique and innovative online content. Home of the first banner ads, for Zima and AT&T.
IBMAn early corporate web site
Innerviews The first online music magazine set up by music journalist Anil Prasad, accessible at: Innerviews: Music Without Borders
Institute of Social and Cultural Anthropology University of Oxford. The web version of a previous Gopher server. Set up in early 1994 by David Price at http://rsl.ox.ac.uk/isca/. No version has been archived but announcements giving the URL date from April 1994 on Humanist-l and anthro-l.
The Irish Times First newspaper in the United Kingdom or Ireland to have a website: irish-times. It was founded in 1994. The newspaper moved to ireland.com in 1999 and irishtimes.com in 2008.
Justin Hall's Links from the Underground One of the earliest examples of personal weblogging.
LawinfoEarly legal website, provides public access to pre-qualified, pre-screened attorneys, and to free legal resources.
Literary KicksEarly literary website about Beat Generation, spoken word poetry and alternative literary scenes, launched by Levi Asher on July 23, 1994.
Lycos Early search engine, originally a university research project by Dr. Michael Mauldin.
Megadeth, ArizonaThe first website for a band, Megadeth.
MicrosoftAn early corporate site.
MIT IHTFP Hack GalleryWebsite dedicated to cataloging Hacks at the Massachusetts Institute of Technology. In continuous operation since 1994, accessible at: IHTFP Hack Gallery: Welcome to the IHTFP Gallery!
Museum of Bad ArtWebsite of a museum "dedicated to the tongue-in-cheek display of poorly conceived or executed examples of Outsider Art in the form of paintings or sculpture."
The Nine Planets"A Multimedia Tour of the Solar System", created by Bill Arnett. One of the first extensively multimedia sites.
Nando.netOne of the first newspaper sites; the online presence of the Raleigh, North Carolina News & Observer.
NetBoyHighly popular early webcomic.
NetrekOne of the first sites dedicated to Internet, multi-user video-game programming; maintained at obsidian.math.Arizona.edu. Defunct.
Onlinetechex.com
Online Technology Exchange, Inc. created the largest worldwide searchable database of electronic components and semiconductor parts
Pathfinder.com
One of the first Internet portals, created by Time Warner.
Pizza Hut
The pizza chain restaurant started by allowing people in Santa Cruz, California to order pizza over the Web.
Powells.comThe website of Powell's Books. It started with two employees; the company's first online order was placed by an Apple employee. It pre-dates Amazon.com.
Purple.comThe first known single-serving site; consists of simply a purple background.
The Radcliffe Science LibraryThe first part of Oxford University to establish a web presence (on 7 Jan 1994) from http://rsl.ox.ac.uk/. The oldest known archive version is on the Wayback Machine from 19.10.1996. The URL is attested on email lists (e.g. Humanist-l) by April 1994.
Radio PragueThe official international broadcasting station of the Czech Republic was an early media entity on the web; they put transcripts of their news broadcasts and other current affairs content in 5 languages on the web. They started in 1994 (and they are still active).
Senator Edward Kennedy
The first website for a member of the U.S. Congress was officially announced on June 2, 1994. The site remained active throughout the remainder of the senator's service until his death in 2009.
Saccharomyces Genome DatabaseNIH funded research project on the Web. Still funded by NIH and online. SGD provide curation of all published results on budding yeast (aka. bakers, brewers, and wine yeast) genes and their products. Current URL is yeastgenome.org.
Sex.comSubject of a twelve-year legal battle that established parameters of domain ownership.
Sighting.comSIGHTINGS began in 1994 as the website home for Jeff Rense's award-winning UFO & Paranormal radio program of the same name.
The Skeptic's DictionaryFeatures definitions, arguments, and essays on topics ranging from acupuncture to zombies, and provides a lively, commonsense trove of detailed information on things supernatural, paranormal, and pseudoscientific.
Steelforge.comCommercial website for open die forge facility.
The Simpsons ArchiveThe first fan site for The Simpsons television show.
Sirius ConnectionsThe first internet service provider in the San Francisco Bay Area. The owner – Arman Kahalili, gave novice website creators a great deal of technical assistance to get the new wave of developers started on building sites and expanding code that was used in later versions of Hypertex Markup Language (HTML) and other web technology.
SpinnWebeEarly humor site, called "a window on the weird" by The New Yorker.
Stak Trading (staktrading.co.uk)Computer hardware resale in the UK. The site was created by Stuart Mackintosh who previously provided software and driver downloads through a Wildcat! BBS and price lists to the trade via Faxmaker faxback systems.
Telegraph.co.ukThe Electronic Telegraph, website of the Daily Telegraph.
Traditio.comThe First Traditional Roman Catholic Internet Site, founded September 29, 1994.
Transdat.comThe first site using the internet for a sales medium on a global scale for heavy machinery.
VeloNewsOne of the first sports news sites, initially providing Tour de France news.
Virginia's Legislative Information Systemleg1.state.va.us. The site remains active today as "LIS Classic". 
VirtuMallCreated in 1994 by MIT dorm mates, pioneered shopping cart technology, pioneered credit card payments sent via fax to mail order catalogs, created the first pooled-traffic site, and helped foster standards for security. One of the first "tenants" was Hickory Farms.
The WWW Useless PagesPerhaps the first site which showcased bad or eccentric websites rather than 'cool' ones.
WebCrawler An early search engine for the Web, and the first with full text searching, by Brian Pinkerton at the University of Washington, announced in June 1994.
Webmedia A London-based web site design company, founded by Steve Bowbrick and Ivan Pope. The domain name webmedia.com was registered on 27 October 1994 and the web site launched in November.
Whitehouse.govThe official website of the White House.
World-Wide Web WormThe World-Wide Web Worm (WWWW) was one of the first search engines for the World-Wide Web, by Oliver McBryan at the University of Colorado, announced in March 1994.
Yahoo!Originally started as "Jerry's Guide to the World Wide Web"; later Yahoo without the exclamation mark.

See also
History of the World Wide Web
Wayback Machine, a project of the Internet Archive which publicly offers partial archives of many now-defunct sites at various points in time

References

Websites founded before 1995
Websites founded before 1995
Websites founded before 1995
Websites founded before 1995
Web 1.0